The Turning Point is a 1978 Soviet drama film directed by Vadim Abdrashitov.

Plot 
Newlyweds cruise on the Black Sea comes to an end. They are waiting for Moscow, work and family life. But suddenly Victor is accused of a crime and the investigation begins.

Cast 
 Oleg Yankovsky as Viktor Vedeneyev
 Irina Kupchenko as Natasha Vedeneyeva
 Anatoliy Solonitsyn as Kostantin Korolyev
 Lyubov Strizhenova as Zina
 Oleg Anofriev
 Natalya Velichko
 Mikhail Dadyko as Andrey Vasilyevich, professor
 Olimpiada Kalmykova
 Aleksandr Kaydanovsky
 Natalya Malyavina as Albina

References

External links 
 

1978 films
1970s Russian-language films
Soviet drama films
1978 drama films